The Alpha Band is the debut album by the rock group The Alpha Band, released in 1976. The band was formed in 1976 from the remnants of Bob Dylan's Rolling Thunder Revue. The core band members were T-Bone Burnett, Steven Soles and David Mansfield.

Track listing

Side one 

 "Interviews" (T-Bone Burnett, Bob Neuwirth, Larry Poons)
 "Cheap Perfume" (Burnett, Neuwirth, J. Steven Soles)
 "Keep It in the Family" (Soles)
 "Ten Figures" (Burnett, Fleming)
 "Wouldn't You Know" (Soles)

Side two 

 "Madman" (Burnett, Soles)
 "The Dogs" (Burnett, Fleming, Phil Taylor)
 "Arizona Telegram" (Soles)
 "Dark Eyes" (Burnett, Fleming)
 "Last Chance to Dance" (Burnett, Carson)

Personnel 
 T-Bone Burnett – vocals, guitar, piano
 David Jackson – bass
 David Mansfield – violin, mandolin, guitar
 Matt Betton – drums
 Steven Soles – vocals, guitar
 K.O. Thomas – keyboards on "Keep it in the Family"
 Rosanna Taplin – background vocals, vocal on "The Dogs"
 Roscoe West – background vocals, vocals on "Interviews"

References 

1976 debut albums
Arista Records albums
The Alpha Band albums